Cozmești is a commune in Iași County, Western Moldavia, Romania. It is composed of three villages: Cozmești, Podolenii de Jos and Podolenii de Sus.

The Sturdza Palace from Cozmești village was built in neo-Gothic style in 1816 by the treasurer Grigoraș Sturdza, based on plans drawn by the architect Iosif Demesovic. Mihail Sturdza, the ruler of Moldavia between 1834 and 1849, built a second floor of the palace. The estate was inherited in 1884 by his son, Grigore Sturdza. Currently, the palace hosts a youth placement center.

The Sfinții Voievozi Church is also located in the village of Cozmești; it was built between 1901 and 1908, and was consecrated on April 5, 1909.  The church was included in 2015 on the list of historical monuments from Iași County.

Natives
 Petru Bogdan

References

Communes in Iași County
Localities in Western Moldavia